Jaramillo may refer to:

People
Jaramillo (surname)

Places
Jaramillo, Chubut, Argentina
Jaramillo, Santa Cruz, Argentina
Jaramillo Creek, stream in New Mexico, United States
Jaramillo de la Fuente, Spain
Jaramillo Quemado, Spain
Jaramillo, Chiriquí, Panama

Events
Jaramillo reversal of Earth magnetic field